Vivien Bronshvag (born July 28, 1942) is an American politician from California and a member of the Democratic Party and has lived in Kentfield, California since 1975.

An alumna of the University of Wisconsin–Madison, Bronshvag was an interior decorator before making her first run for the California State Assembly in 1990. She lost that race to then-incumbent Republican Bill Filante, who had represented the Marin-Sonoma based 9th district since 1979. When Filante left in 1992 to run for congress, Bronshvag ran again, this time in the renumbered 6th district.

She spent $250,000 of her own money and won the Democratic primary with 52% of the vote, more than 30 points ahead of her closest competitor. She went on to win the general election as well, beating then Marin County supervisor Al Aramburu by 15 points.

By 1994, however, Bronshvag had developed a less than flattering reputation in the state capitol. She acquired the nickname "the duchess" among staffers who felt she treated them like serfs. Then a speeding ticket cost her a suspended driver's license and prompted the nickname "the flying duchess".

Despite once again spending much of her own money, she lost the Democratic primary to then Novato school board member Kerry Mazzoni. In fact her baggage was such that she even lost her home county, Marin.

Electoral history

References

External links
Join California Vivien Bronshvag

Living people
Democratic Party members of the California State Assembly
People from Kentfield, California
Women state legislators in California
1942 births
University of Wisconsin–Madison alumni
21st-century American women